In mathematics, a fake projective space is a complex algebraic variety that has the same Betti numbers as some projective space, but is not isomorphic to it.

There are exactly 50 fake projective planes.  found four examples of fake projective 4-folds, and showed that no arithmetic examples exist in dimensions other than 2 and 4.

References

Algebraic geometry